Hinderwell is a village and civil parish in the Scarborough district of North Yorkshire, England which lies within the North York Moors National Park, about a mile from the coast on the A174 road between the towns of Loftus and Whitby. The 2011 UK census states Hinderwell parish had a population of 1,875,
a decrease on the 2001 UK census figure of 2,013. Hinderwell is the most northerly parish in the Scarborough Borough Council area. Hinderwell is mentioned in the Domesday Book of 1086 as Hildrewell, and is said to have got its name from Saint Hilda of Whitby, the Abbess of Whitby Abbey.

The civil parish of Hinderwell encompasses:
 the village of Staithes
 the hamlet of Port Mulgrave 
 the hamlet of Runswick Bay , a popular beach resort with a lifeboat service operated independently since 1982.
 the hamlet of Dalehouse

Culture and events 
Hinderwell lies less than a mile inland from the Cleveland Way National Trail, along with the National Trust Rosedale Cliffs.

Transport 
Up until 1958 the area was served by Staithes and Hinderwell railway stations.

Sport

Football 
Hinderwell Football Club is based on Sports Park, on the south side of the village on High Street, and compete in the Eskvale & Cleveland Football League.

Cricket 
Hinderwell Cricket Club is located on Sports Park, on the south side of the village on High Street. The club have a Midweek XI team that compete in the Esk Valley Evening League and a junior section play in the Whitby & District Junior Cricket League.

Notable residents 
 Richard Osbaldeston, later Bishop of Carlisle and Bishop of London, was instituted as rector of Hinderwell in 1715.
 Beth Mead MBE grew up in the village and made her debut for the senior England women's national football team in 2018, represented England in the World Cup in 2019, and the Euros in 2022.

References

External links 

 Village website
 

Villages in North Yorkshire
Civil parishes in North Yorkshire
Populated coastal places in North Yorkshire
Borough of Scarborough